Alexander Alexandrovich Bolshunov (also tr. Aleksandr Aleksandrovich Bolshunov; born 31 December 1996) is a Russian cross-country skier and two-time winner of the 14th and 15th Tour de Ski.

Bolshunov is a nine-time Olympic medalist, three of which are gold, and is also the first male post-Soviet Russian World Cup champion, winning the overall World Cup in 2020 and 2021.

Career

2013–17: Twofold U23 World Champion
Bolshunov was born in Podyvotye in the Bryansk Oblast, located just several kilometres from the Russia-Ukraine border. It was there were he started his sports career with his coach and father Alexander Ivanovich Bolshunov. In 2011, his father brought him to the Bryansk sports school for ski-cross skiing, where he was coached by Merited Coach of Russia N. I. Nekhitrov. The first victories on nationals came a year ago, when on 6 February 2013 Bolshunov took the first place in 10 km classic in a tournament taking place in the Tver Oblast.

On 17 March 2014, Bolshunov won the 20 km skiathlon event at the Russian Junior Nationals, resulting Bolshunov being bestowed the honorary Master of Sports of Russia. After the nationals he was invited to the junior team. A year later, he participated in the sprint event of the FIS Junior World Ski Championships in Almaty, Kazakhstan, but failed to qualify for the sprint final, leaving him without medals. In the following Youth Championships in Rasnov, Romania, his best result was 2nd, in the relay event.

In 2017, Bolshunov took part in the FIS U23 World Ski Championships in the venue Soldier Hollow, Utah, United States, where the 2002 Winter Olympics were held. He won silver in sprint, and a few days later he won the 15 km individual freestyle event. The skiathlon event was marked by a memorable performance by teammates Bolshunov, Alexey Chervotkin and Denis Spitsov, who entered the finish line hand in hand. Bolshunov was declared the winner after video review. As a result, Bolshunov was conferred the highest honorary sports title of Russia, "International Master of Sports".

2017–18: FIS World Cup debut
Bolshunov's first major senior tournament in which he competed was the FIS Nordic World Ski Championships 2017 in Lahti, Finland, finishing 26th in sprint and 15th in skiathlon. In the 2016–17 season, he entered his first FIS World Cup stage in Drammen, Norway, in March 2017, finishing 9th. He won his first podium in the next season in the third Stage World Cup in Ruka, Finland, on 26 November, in 15 km freestyle pursuit. In the overall standings of the three Ruka stages, the "Ruka Triple", he was placed third. He showed strong results by the year's end, finishing four times in the third places.

After the 2017–18 Tour de Ski – in the 15 km pursuit stage, he reached the third-place – Bolshunov missed a handful of WC stages to prepare for the 2018 Winter Olympics in Pyeongchang, South Korea. At the Olympics, he rebounded by winning three silver medals and one bronze medal. He won his first Olympic medal in sprint classical, losing only to Johannes Høsflot Klæbo and Federico Pellegrino. Bolshunov then won medals in team sprint freestyle, 4 × 10 km relay and 50 km classical.

2018–19: Distance Cup winner
In March, Bolshunov reached second place in a WC stage for the first time in his career in the 15 km classical event in Lahti. He also finished third in a WC stage in Drammen, now in sprint classical. Bolshunov won the World Cup Final by the season's end after winning the 15 km classical mass start and 15 km freestyle pursuit stages. In the overall World Cup standings he was placed 5th.

In the 2018–19 FIS Cross-Country World Cup season, Bolshunov won the first two WC stages in Ruka, in sprint classical and 15 km classical, receiving the yellow bib as a result. Bolshunov led in the overall standings after fifteen stages until being replaced by Johannes Høsflot Klæbo during the Tour de Ski.

Before the World Championships, Bolshunov clinched another stage win in Italian Cogne in 15 km classical. Bolshunov debuted at the World and won four silver medals in 30 km skiathlon, 50 km freestyle mass start, as well as in team sprint and 4 × 10 km relay. On 9 March, he won another stage in 50 km classical mass start in Holmenkollen, returning the yellow bib after Klæbo's poor performance there. As a result, Bolshunov, at age 22, became not only the youngest winner of the marathon stage but also the youngest winner of the Distance Cup, claiming the Small Crystal Globe.

2019–20: Tour de Ski champion, World Cup overall winner
Bolshunov started the 2019–20 FIS Cross-Country World Cup by participating in the mini-event 2019 Nordic Opening, where he was positioned fifth in the overall ranking. He won the next stage in Lillehammer for the first time in the 30 km skiathlon classic and freestyle event. Bolshunov entered the 2019–20 Tour de Ski by reaching third place in 15 km mass start freestyle. He reached five out of six podium places in the following stages, only failing in the first sprint stage in Lenzerheide, stopping in the semi-finals. Although he won only one stage and five times finished third, he took the first position in the overall ranking, becoming the third Russian to do so. After this victory, he received the right to wear the yellow bib previously worn by Klæbo. He went on winning three back-to-back long-distance stages, doing so in Nové Město and Oberstdorf.

Before the FIS Ski Tour 2020, Bolshunov finished third in the sprint and first in the 15 km mass start stage, both in Falun. In the inaugural Ski Tour, Bolshunov led in the overall standings after the 5th stage, but in the 6th stage, following an ill-conceived preparation of the skies by the team staff, who hoped the snowfall would stop soon and so decided not to use the no wax anti-ice method, Bolshunov finished 7th. In the same month, in February, Bolshunov took the second position in 15 km classic in Lahti. He finished the season by winning the 50 km classic mass start event in Oslo and went on to win the overall World Cup ahead of schedule after the remaining stages did not take place due to the coronavirus outbreak. He became the first post-Soviet Russian male ski-cross skier to win the World Cup and the first Russian since Soviet Vladimir Smirnov, who won the 1991 edition. Beside that, Bolshunov won his second consecutive Distance Cup title. Due to the pandemic, the ceremony was postponed indefinitely, and the Crystal Globe was presented to the Russian only three months later.

2020–21: Back-to-back Tour de Ski, World Cup overall champion, World Champion
Bolshunov started the new season finishing overall second in the Ruka Triple after only Klæbo. Before the 2021 Tour de Ski, he claimed a distance title in Swiss Davos and his first team title in team sprint with Retivykh, in a sprint tournament traditionally taking place in Dresden, Germany, this time without Norwegian, Finnish and Swedish skiers, after their federations decided to quit sending skiers due to concerns over COVID-19. As a result of the withdrawal, Bolshunov was awarded the yellow bib. The Tour de Ski saw a return of Swedish and Finnish, but not Norwegian skiers.

After the first sprint stage, where Bolshunov finished second, the Russian won five consecutive stages, repeating the World Cup tour record of Ustiugov and Dæhlie, but failed to update the record as he came third in the following sprint stage in Val di Fiemme. In the 10 km Final Climb Mass Start stage, he finished 2nd. But this secured him winning the Tour de Ski for a second time, finishing by a record margin of three minutes twenty-three seconds ahead of other skiers. During the final stage of the ski race in Lahti Bolshunov attempted twice to slash Finnish skier Joni Mäki, and towards the finish rammed Mäki and knocked him down, resulting Bolshunov being disqualified. Bolshunov officially apologized for his behaviour after the competition.

Bolshunov participated at the 2021 World Championships, where he won four medals. In the 30 km skiathlon, he got his first gold medal at this event. At the 50 km classical event, Bolshunov initially finished third, but following Klæbo's disqualification, which happened after the Norwegian broke one of Bolshunov's poles, the Russian earned the silver medal at the end. Bolshunov won further medals in team sprint and 4 × 10 kilometre relay. However, he finished fourth in sprint and 15 km freestyle.

Personal life
Since 2017, Bolshunov is studying at the Penza State University's Faculty of Institute of Physical Education.

Bolshunov is married to fellow Russian cross-country skier Anna Zherebyateva, since 23 April 2021.

On 10 February 2022, Bolshunov, who was previously senior lieutenant, received the rank of captain by the National Guard of Russia in recognition of his achievements at the 2022 Olympics

On 18 March 2022, Bolshunov participated in the Moscow rally in support of the Russian invasion of Ukraine.

Regarding the 2023 World Championship that Russian athletes were missing due to the invasion of Ukraine, Bolshunov said: "I'm not interested in what's going on at these dirty competitions. We can organize both the World Championships and the Olympic Games better than anyone." He further commented that "There is only one championship, and we have it [the Russian national championship] All other questions - goodbye! I'm not interested in what is happening now at the World Cup and the World Championship. I want to tell you that the whole world is here." He also expressed confidence that Russian athletes will be allowed to compete at the 2026 Winter Olympics: "We will compete at the 2026 Olympics. Everything has its time. Mark my words."

Cross-country skiing results
All results are sourced from the International Ski Federation (FIS).

Olympic Games
 9 medals – (3 gold, 4 silver, 2 bronze)

Distance reduced to 30 km due to weather conditions.

World Championships
8 medals – (1 gold, 6 silver, 1 bronze)

World Cup

Season titles
 5 titles – (2 Overall, 3 Distance)

Season standings

Individual podiums
 28 victories – (20 , 8 ) 
 59 podiums – (34 , 25 )

Team podiums
 1 victory – (1 ) 
 4 podiums – (3 , 2 )

Notes

References

External links

1996 births
Living people
People from Bryansk Oblast
Russian military personnel
Sports controversies
Penza State University alumni
Russian male cross-country skiers
Cross-country skiers at the 2018 Winter Olympics
Cross-country skiers at the 2022 Winter Olympics
Olympic cross-country skiers of Russia
Medalists at the 2018 Winter Olympics
Medalists at the 2022 Winter Olympics
Olympic gold medalists for the Russian Olympic Committee athletes
Olympic silver medalists for the Russian Olympic Committee athletes
Olympic silver medalists for Olympic Athletes from Russia
Olympic bronze medalists for the Russian Olympic Committee athletes
Olympic bronze medalists for Olympic Athletes from Russia
Olympic medalists in cross-country skiing
Tour de Ski skiers
FIS Nordic World Ski Championships medalists in cross-country skiing
Tour de Ski winners
FIS Cross-Country World Cup champions
Sportspeople from Bryansk Oblast